Corner Island is a small island in the form of a crude right angle, lying 0.1 nautical miles (0.2 km) northeast of Galindez Island in the Argentine Islands, Wilhelm Archipelago. Charted and named in 1935 by the British Graham Land Expedition (BGLE) under John Rymill.

See also 
 List of antarctic and sub-antarctic islands

References

Subantarctic islands